Murdoch Park 'n' Ride was a Transperth bus station located in Murdoch, Western Australia. It opened on 14 December 1994 with parking for 583 cars.

On 31 January 2007 it closed to facilitate the construction of Murdoch railway station, which incorporated a bus facility on a bridge structure extending over the Kwinana Freeway carriageways and train station. The Park & Ride no longer exists as a bus station, but now operates as a fully integrated bus/train interchange. The buses now leave from the purpose-built bus way bridge that runs parallel to the South Street overpass.

References

Bus stations in Perth, Western Australia
Former bus stations
Murdoch, Western Australia
Transport infrastructure completed in 1994
1994 establishments in Australia
2007 disestablishments in Australia